Multiple global locations were used for filming locations during the production of the Star Wars films to provide the setting for alien planets in the Star Wars Universe.

Most locations were used to shoot principal photography with actors; more recently as digital filmmaking has become more common, some prequel and sequel trilogy locations were shot with no actors present and digitally composited into the films to provide a backdrop of a story setting.

In addition to filming locations, a list of film studios is also included for reference.

Locations
Listed below are locations used for filming of the following Star Wars films:

Star Wars: Episode IV – A New Hope (1977)
Star Wars: Episode V – The Empire Strikes Back (1980)
Star Wars: Episode VI – Return of the Jedi (1983)
Star Wars: Episode I – The Phantom Menace (1999)
Star Wars: Episode II – Attack of the Clones (2002)
Star Wars: Episode III – Revenge of the Sith (2005)
Star Wars: Episode VII – The Force Awakens (2015)
Rogue One: A Star Wars Story (2016)
Star Wars: Episode VIII – The Last Jedi (2017)
Solo: A Star Wars Story (2018)
Star Wars: Episode IX - The Rise of Skywalker (2019)

Map

{
  "type": "FeatureCollection",
  "features": [
    {
      "type": "Feature",
      "properties": {
        "title": " Fuerteventura, Canary Islands",
        "description": "Location for the planet Savareen",
        "marker-symbol": "cinema",
        "marker-size": "medium",
        "marker-color": "06C"
      },
      "geometry": {
        "type": "Point",
        "coordinates": [
          -14.016667,
          28.333333
        ]
      }
    },
    {
      "type": "Feature",
      "properties": {
        "title": " Phang Nga",
        "description": "Landscape of Kashyyyk",
        "marker-symbol": "cinema",
        "marker-size": "medium",
        "marker-color": "06C"
      },
      "geometry": {
        "type": "Point",
        "coordinates": [
          98.6,
          8.283333
        ]
      }
    },
    {
      "type": "Feature",
      "properties": {
        "title": " Guilin",
        "description": "Landscape of Kashyyyk",
        "marker-symbol": "cinema",
        "marker-size": "medium",
        "marker-color": "06C"
      },
      "geometry": {
        "type": "Point",
        "coordinates": [
          110.28,
          25.27
        ]
      }
    },
    {
      "type": "Feature",
      "properties": {
        "title": " Laamu Atoll",
        "description": "Location for Scarif",
        "marker-symbol": "cinema",
        "marker-size": "medium",
        "marker-color": "06C"
      },
      "geometry": {
        "type": "Point",
        "coordinates": [
          73.418,
          1.9431
        ]
      }
    },
    {
      "type": "Feature",
      "properties": {
        "title": " Wadi Rum",
        "description": "Location for the planets Planet Jedha and Pasaana",
        "marker-symbol": "cinema",
        "marker-size": "medium",
        "marker-color": "06C"
      },
      "geometry": {
        "type": "Point",
        "coordinates": [
          35.42,
          29.5931
        ]
      }
    },
    {
      "type": "Feature",
      "properties": {
        "title": " Rub' al Khali",
        "description": "Location for the planet Jakku",
        "marker-symbol": "cinema",
        "marker-size": "medium",
        "marker-color": "06C"
      },
      "geometry": {
        "type": "Point",
        "coordinates": [
          50,
          20
        ]
      }
    },
    {
      "type": "Feature",
      "properties": {
        "title": " Lake Misurina",
        "description": "Location for the planet Vandor-1",
        "marker-symbol": "cinema",
        "marker-size": "medium",
        "marker-color": "06C"
      },
      "geometry": {
        "type": "Point",
        "coordinates": [
          12.253889,
          46.581944
        ]
      }
    },
    {
      "type": "Feature",
      "properties": {
        "title": " Death Valley, CA",
        "description": "Various locations for Tatooine",
        "marker-symbol": "cinema",
        "marker-size": "medium",
        "marker-color": "06C"
      },
      "geometry": {
        "type": "Point",
        "coordinates": [
          -116.82,
          36.24
        ]
      }
    },
    {
      "type": "Feature",
      "properties": {
        "title": " Redwood National Park, Del Norte County, CA",
        "description": "Forest moon of Endor",
        "marker-symbol": "cinema",
        "marker-size": "medium",
        "marker-color": "06C"
      },
      "geometry": {
        "type": "Point",
        "coordinates": [
          -124,
          41.3
        ]
      }
    },
    {
      "type": "Feature",
      "properties": {
        "title": " Buttercup Valley, Yuma Desert",
        "description": "Tatooine locations",
        "marker-symbol": "cinema",
        "marker-size": "medium",
        "marker-color": "06C"
      },
      "geometry": {
        "type": "Point",
        "coordinates": [
          -112.93,
          32.66
        ]
      }
    },
    {
      "type": "Feature",
      "properties": {
        "title": " Tikal ",
        "description": "Location for Yavin IV base",
        "marker-symbol": "cinema",
        "marker-size": "medium",
        "marker-color": "06C"
      },
      "geometry": {
        "type": "Point",
        "coordinates": [
          -89.62,
          17.22
        ]
      }
    },
    {
      "type": "Feature",
      "properties": {
        "title": " Salar de Uyuni",
        "description": "Location for Crait",
        "marker-symbol": "cinema",
        "marker-size": "medium",
        "marker-color": "06C"
      },
      "geometry": {
        "type": "Point",
        "coordinates": [
          -67.489133,
          -20.133755
        ]
      }
    },
    {
      "type": "Feature",
      "properties": {
        "title": " Whippendell Woods, Watford",
        "description": "Location for the planet Naboo",
        "marker-symbol": "cinema",
        "marker-size": "medium",
        "marker-color": "06C"
      },
      "geometry": {
        "type": "Point",
        "coordinates": [
          -0.416667,
          51.659722
        ]
      }
    },
    {
      "type": "Feature",
      "properties": {
        "title": " Elstree Studios, Borehamwood",
        "description": "Sound stage filming",
        "marker-symbol": "industrial",
        "marker-size": "medium",
        "marker-color": "f00"
      },
      "geometry": {
        "type": "Point",
        "coordinates": [
          -0.2691,
          51.6581
        ]
      }
    },
    {
      "type": "Feature",
      "properties": {
        "title": " Pinewood Studios, Slough",
        "description": "Sound stage filming",
        "marker-symbol": "industrial",
        "marker-size": "medium",
        "marker-color": "f00"
      },
      "geometry": {
        "type": "Point",
        "coordinates": [
          -0.535,
          51.548611
        ]
      }
    },
    {
      "type": "Feature",
      "properties": {
        "title": " Ealing Studios, West London",
        "description": "Sound stage filming",
        "marker-symbol": "industrial",
        "marker-size": "medium",
        "marker-color": "f00"
      },
      "geometry": {
        "type": "Point",
        "coordinates": [
          -0.307258,
          51.509016
        ]
      }
    },
    {
      "type": "Feature",
      "properties": {
        "title": " Leavesden Studios, Watford",
        "description": "Sound stage filming",
        "marker-symbol": "industrial",
        "marker-size": "medium",
        "marker-color": "f00"
      },
      "geometry": {
        "type": "Point",
        "coordinates": [
          -0.419722,
          51.693333
        ]
      }
    },
    {
      "type": "Feature",
      "properties": {
        "title": " Shepperton Studios, Surrey",
        "description": "Sound stage filming",
        "marker-symbol": "industrial",
        "marker-size": "medium",
        "marker-color": "f00"
      },
      "geometry": {
        "type": "Point",
        "coordinates": [
          -0.465181,
          51.406889
        ]
      }
    },
    {
      "type": "Feature",
      "properties": {
        "title": " RAF Cardington, Bedfordshire",
        "description": "Location for the Yavin IV Rebel Base",
        "marker-symbol": "cinema",
        "marker-size": "medium",
        "marker-color": "06C"
      },
      "geometry": {
        "type": "Point",
        "coordinates": [
          -0.4225,
          52.108889
        ]
      }
    },
    {
      "type": "Feature",
      "properties": {
        "title": " Ivinghoe Beacon",
        "description": "Location for Kef Bir",
        "marker-symbol": "cinema",
        "marker-size": "medium",
        "marker-color": "06C"
      },
      "geometry": {
        "type": "Point",
        "coordinates": [
          -0.605755,
          51.841985
        ]
      }
    },
    {
      "type": "Feature",
      "properties": {
        "title": " Bovingdon Airfield",
        "description": "Location for Scarif battle scenes",
        "marker-symbol": "cinema",
        "marker-size": "medium",
        "marker-color": "06C"
      },
      "geometry": {
        "type": "Point",
        "coordinates": [
          -0.543333,
          51.726944
        ]
      }
    },
    {
      "type": "Feature",
      "properties": {
        "title": " Canary Wharf tube station",
        "description": "Location for the Imperial base on Scarif",
        "marker-symbol": "cinema",
        "marker-size": "medium",
        "marker-color": "06C"
      },
      "geometry": {
        "type": "Point",
        "coordinates": [
          -0.01861,
          51.50361
        ]
      }
    },
    {
      "type": "Feature",
      "properties": {
        "title": " RAF Greenham Common",
        "description": "Location for the Resistance Base on D'Qar ",
        "marker-symbol": "cinema",
        "marker-size": "medium",
        "marker-color": "06C"
      },
      "geometry": {
        "type": "Point",
        "coordinates": [
          -1.282222,
          51.378611
        ]
      }
    },
    {
      "type": "Feature",
      "properties": {
        "title": " Puzzlewood, Forest of Dean",
        "description": "Location for forest scenes on Takodana",
        "marker-symbol": "cinema",
        "marker-size": "medium",
        "marker-color": "06C"
      },
      "geometry": {
        "type": "Point",
        "coordinates": [
          -2.615,
          51.78
        ]
      }
    },
    {
      "type": "Feature",
      "properties": {
        "title": " Thirlmere, Cumbria",
        "description": "Backdrop for flight sequences over Takodana",
        "marker-symbol": "cinema",
        "marker-size": "medium",
        "marker-color": "06C"
      },
      "geometry": {
        "type": "Point",
        "coordinates": [
          -3.066667,
          54.533333
        ]
      }
    },
    {
      "type": "Feature",
      "properties": {
        "title": " Derwentwater, Cumbria",
        "description": "Eastablishing shots of Maz Kanata's Castle on Takodana",
        "marker-symbol": "cinema",
        "marker-size": "medium",
        "marker-color": "06C"
      },
      "geometry": {
        "type": "Point",
        "coordinates": [
          -3.15,
          54.583333
        ]
      }
    },
    {
      "type": "Feature",
      "properties": {
        "title": " Eyjafjallajökull",
        "description": "Location for the planet Ilum (Starkiller Base)",
        "marker-symbol": "cinema",
        "marker-size": "medium",
        "marker-color": "06C"
      },
      "geometry": {
        "type": "Point",
        "coordinates": [
          -19.613333,
          63.62
        ]
      }
    },
    {
      "type": "Feature",
      "properties": {
        "title": " Reynisfjara",
        "description": "Location for the Planet Eadu",
        "marker-symbol": "cinema",
        "marker-size": "medium",
        "marker-color": "06C"
      },
      "geometry": {
        "type": "Point",
        "coordinates": [
          -19.0283,
          63.4028
        ]
      }
    },
    {
      "type": "Feature",
      "properties": {
        "title": " Mount Etna",
        "description": "Location for the Planet Mustafar",
        "marker-symbol": "cinema",
        "marker-size": "medium",
        "marker-color": "06C"
      },
      "geometry": {
        "type": "Point",
        "coordinates": [
          14.99,
          37.75
        ]
      }
    },
    {
      "type": "Feature",
      "properties": {
        "title": " Palace of Caserta",
        "description": "Location for the Royal Palace on Naboo",
        "marker-symbol": "cinema",
        "marker-size": "medium",
        "marker-color": "06C"
      },
      "geometry": {
        "type": "Point",
        "coordinates": [
          14.33,
          41.07
        ]
      }
    },
    {
      "type": "Feature",
      "properties": {
        "title": " Hardangerjøkulen",
        "description": "Location for the Planet Hoth",
        "marker-symbol": "cinema",
        "marker-size": "medium",
        "marker-color": "06C"
      },
      "geometry": {
        "type": "Point",
        "coordinates": [
          7.416667,
          60.533333
        ]
      }
    },
    {
      "type": "Feature",
      "properties": {
        "title": " Plaza de España, Seville",
        "description": "Location for the City of Theed on the Planet Naboo",
        "marker-symbol": "cinema",
        "marker-size": "medium",
        "marker-color": "06C"
      },
      "geometry": {
        "type": "Point",
        "coordinates": [
          -5.986944,
          37.377222
        ]
      }
    },
    {
      "type": "Feature",
      "properties": {
        "title": " Grindelwald",
        "description": "Backdrop for the Planet Hoth",
        "marker-symbol": "cinema",
        "marker-size": "medium",
        "marker-color": "06C"
      },
      "geometry": {
        "type": "Point",
        "coordinates": [
          8.033333,
          46.616667
        ]
      }
    },
    {
      "type": "Feature",
      "properties": {
        "title": " Villa del Balbianello, Lake Como",
        "description": "Location for the wedding scene on Naboo",
        "marker-symbol": "cinema",
        "marker-size": "medium",
        "marker-color": "06C"
      },
      "geometry": {
        "type": "Point",
        "coordinates": [
          9.2,
          45.97
        ]
      }
    },
    {
      "type": "Feature",
      "properties": {
        "title": " Skellig Michael",
        "description": "Location for the Planet Ahch-To",
        "marker-symbol": "cinema",
        "marker-size": "medium",
        "marker-color": "06C"
      },
      "geometry": {
        "type": "Point",
        "coordinates": [
          -10.54,
          51.77
        ]
      }
    },
    {
      "type": "Feature",
      "properties": {
        "title": " Dubrovnik",
        "description": "Location for the city of Canto Bight on Cantonica",
        "marker-symbol": "cinema",
        "marker-size": "medium",
        "marker-color": "06C"
      },
      "geometry": {
        "type": "Point",
        "coordinates": [
          18.1,
          42.64
        ]
      }
    },
    {
      "type": "Feature",
      "properties": {
        "title": " Chott el Djerid, Nefta",
        "description": "Location for the Lars homestead on Tatooine",
        "marker-symbol": "cinema",
        "marker-size": "medium",
        "marker-color": "06C"
      },
      "geometry": {
        "type": "Point",
        "coordinates": [
          7.883333,
          33.883333
        ]
      }
    },
    {
      "type": "Feature",
      "properties": {
        "title": " Hotel Sidi Driss, Matmata",
        "description": "Tatooine location ",
        "marker-symbol": "cinema",
        "marker-size": "medium",
        "marker-color": "06C"
      },
      "geometry": {
        "type": "Point",
        "coordinates": [
          9.966806,
          33.542639
        ]
      }
    },
    {
      "type": "Feature",
      "properties": {
        "title": " Ksar Hadada, Ghoumrassen",
        "description": "Location for Mos Espa on Tatooine ",
        "marker-symbol": "cinema",
        "marker-size": "medium",
        "marker-color": "06C"
      },
      "geometry": {
        "type": "Point",
        "coordinates": [
          10.31,
          33.1
        ]
      }
    },
    {
      "type": "Feature",
      "properties": {
        "title": " Ajim, Island of Djerba",
        "description": "Location for Mos Eisley on Tatooine ",
        "marker-symbol": "cinema",
        "marker-size": "medium",
        "marker-color": "06C"
      },
      "geometry": {
        "type": "Point",
        "coordinates": [
          10.75,
          33.716667
        ]
      }
    },
    {
      "type": "Feature",
      "properties": {
        "title": "Mosque Sidi Jemour, Island of Djerba",
        "description": "Location for exterior scenes at Anchorhead on Tatooine (deleted scenes)",
        "marker-symbol": "cinema",
        "marker-size": "medium",
        "marker-color": "06C"
      },
      "geometry": {
        "type": "Point",
        "coordinates": [
          10.747606,
          33.83186
        ]
      }
    },
    {
      "type": "Feature",
      "properties": {
        "title": " Onk Jemal, Tozeur",
        "description": "Location for Mos Espa on Tatooine",
        "marker-symbol": "cinema",
        "marker-size": "medium",
        "marker-color": "06C"
      },
      "geometry": {
        "type": "Point",
        "coordinates": [
          7.842748,
          33.99403
        ]
      }
    },
    {
      "type": "Feature",
      "properties": {
        "title": " Fox Studios, Sydney",
        "description": "Sound stage filming",
        "marker-symbol": "industrial",
        "marker-size": "medium",
        "marker-color": "f00"
      },
      "geometry": {
        "type": "Point",
        "coordinates": [
          151.22851,
          -33.89202
        ]
      }
    }
  ]
}

Location filming

Studios

See also

Behind-the-scenes documentaries:
The Making of Star Wars
SP FX: The Empire Strikes Back
Classic Creatures: Return of the Jedi
From Star Wars to Jedi: The Making of a Saga
Empire of Dreams: The Story of the Star Wars Trilogy
Star Wars: The Legacy Revealed

References
Notes

Sources

External links

Galaxy Tours | Star Wars Film Sites in Tunisia - Professional website. Comprehensive information on all Star Wars locations in Tunisia.
Star Wars Locations and their GPS coordinates - Article featuring every filming location, Lat/Long coordinates and scene comparisons.
Star Wars Locations - fan site devoted to Star Wars filming locations
Star Wars filming locations category on Wookieepedia
Star Wars filming locations category on 501st Legion Spanish Garrison
 Filming locations on the Internet Movie Database:
Episode I: The Phantom Menace
Episode II: Attack of the Clones
Episode III: Revenge of the Sith
Episode IV: A New Hope
Episode V: The Empire Strikes Back
Episode VI: Return of the Jedi
Episode VII: The Force Awakens
George Lucas's filming locations on Movie-Locations.com

Filming locations by franchise
filming